The Chinese Consolidated Benevolent Association Building is an historic building in Chinatown Victoria, British Columbia, Canada.

See also
 List of historic places in Victoria, British Columbia

References

External links
 

1885 establishments in Canada
Buildings and structures completed in 1885
Buildings and structures in Victoria, British Columbia